Suziela binte Azrai (born 1975) better known as Suzie is a Malaysian Bruneian actress and former beauty queen titleholder who was crowned Miss Malaysia Universe 1995. She represented Malaysia at Miss Universe 1995 in Windheok, Namibia but was unplaced, ended up did not make it to the semifinalists round, this is the 25th consecutive year Malaysia did not placed in Miss Universe pageant.

Filmography

References 

1975 births
Living people
Malaysian beauty pageant winners
Malaysian Muslims
Malaysian people of Malay descent
Miss Universe 1995 contestants
Malaysian people of Bruneian descent
People from Selangor